Sayyid Mohammad Hashemi is an Iranian businessman and former intelligence officer. He was one of "the core group of leaders" of the Muslim Student Followers of the Imam's Line involved in the Iran Hostage Crisis, the first deputy of the Ministry of Intelligence and Security for some years. From 2003 to 2004, when the venture went bankrupt, he was a developer of a proposed vacation resort on the Caspian Sea called Cham Paradise. He is the husband of Masoumeh Ebtekar, another well-known Iranian and former spokesperson for the hostage takers.

References and notes

Living people
Deputies of the Ministry of Intelligence (Iran)
Muslim Student Followers of the Imam's Line
1951 births
Islamic Revolutionary Guard Corps officers